Anaheim General Hospital was a 142-bed hospital located at 3350 W Ball Road in Anaheim, California. It was owned and operated by Tustin-based Pacific Health Corp, and included emergency and acute care.

Closure 
The hospital closed permanently on May 23, 2013. The closure was prompted by a July 2009 decision by federal authorities to withdraw Medicare and Medi-Cal support due to series of failed inspections. Issues related to unclean and unsafe equipment and lack of proper medications in stock in the operating department. Prior to the closure, Pacific Health Corp. endured a seven million dollar fine related to improper collection of premiums without coverage and payroll issues.

References

Defunct hospitals in California
Buildings and structures in Anaheim, California
Hospitals disestablished in 2013
2013 disestablishments in California